Cairns Vezey Raffety (9 August 1906 – 28 September 1991) was an English cricketer. Raffety was a left-handed batsman who bowled slow left-arm orthodox. He was born in Orpington, Kent and educated at Cranleigh School, where he represented the school cricket team.

Raffety made his debut for Buckinghamshire in the 1924 Minor Counties Championship against the Leicestershire Second XI. Raffety played Minor counties cricket for Buckinghamshire from 1924 to 1932, making 17 appearances.

He made his only first-class appearance for the Minor Counties cricket team against the touring New Zealanders in 1931. In his only innings in the match, he was dismissed for 16 by Tom Lowry.

He died in Eastbourne, Sussex on 28 September 1991.

References

External links
Vezey Raffety at ESPNcricinfo
Vezey Raffety at CricketArchive

1906 births
1991 deaths
People from Orpington
People educated at Cranleigh School
English cricketers
Buckinghamshire cricketers
Minor Counties cricketers